Anatis rathvoni, commonly known as the Rathvon lady beetle or the flying saucer ladybug, is a species of ladybug in the family Coccinellidae. The species is named for Simon Rathvon, a 19th-century American entomologist.

References

Coccinellidae